are comics created in Japan, or by Japanese creators in the Japanese language, conforming to a style developed in Japan in the late 19th century. The term is also now used for a variety of other works in the style of or influenced by the Japanese comics. The production of manga in many forms remains extremely prolific, so a single list covering all the notable works would not be a useful document. Accordingly, coverage is divided into the many related lists below.

Lists of manga titles
 List of best-selling manga
 List of manga licensed in English
 List of manga series by volume count
 List of Osamu Tezuka manga
 List of hentai manga published in English
 List of manga magazines
 List of Japanese manga magazines by circulation
List of manga published by Kadokawa Shoten
 List of manga published by Akita Shoten
 List of manga published by ASCII Media Works
 List of manga published by Hakusensha
List of manga published by Kodansha
 List of manga published by Shogakukan
List of manga published by Shueisha
 Lists of manga volumes and chapters
 List of The New York Times Manga Best Sellers
 The New York Times Manga Best Sellers of 2009
 The New York Times Manga Best Sellers of 2010
 The New York Times Manga Best Sellers of 2011
 The New York Times Manga Best Sellers of 2012
 The New York Times Manga Best Sellers of 2013
 The New York Times Manga Best Sellers of 2014
 The New York Times Manga Best Sellers of 2015
 Lists of Oricon number-one manga
 List of Oricon number-one manga of 2008
 List of Oricon number-one manga of 2012
 List of Oricon number-one manga of 2013
 List of Oricon number-one manga of 2014
 List of Oricon number-one manga of 2015
 List of Oricon number-one manga of 2016
 Pokémon (manga)
 List of romance manga
 List of series run in Weekly Shōnen Sunday
 List of Square Enix manga franchises

Lists of manga producers
 List of manga artists
 List of manga publishers
 List of manga distributors

Lists of related media
 List of light novels
 List of manhua
 List of manhwa

See also
 Lists of anime
 :Category: Lists of anime and manga characters
 List of films based on manga
 List of video games based on anime or manga

Citations

References

 
 

 
J